José Manuel Hernández (born 24 February 1941) is a Guatemalan wrestler. He competed in two events at the 1968 Summer Olympics.

References

1941 births
Living people
Guatemalan male sport wrestlers
Olympic wrestlers of Guatemala
Wrestlers at the 1968 Summer Olympics